Federation University Australia, Berwick Campus is a campus of Federation University Australia located in Berwick, which is a suburb of Melbourne, Australia, in the state of Victoria. It offers degrees in [[Information Technology]], [[Psychology]], [[Business]] and [[Commerce]], [[Criminal Justice]], [[Nursing]] and [[Education]].

It is situated in the City of Casey, one of Australia's fastest growing areas with approximately 2000 students attending the Campus. The campus's  buildings  were  opened  in 1996. Small in comparison to other campuses, it  covered an area of only 55 hectares. A student accommodation building was completed in 2006 to stabilise the demand generated by both local and the vast number of international students. Faculties have come and gone over the years and now the School of Nursing and Healthcare Professions holds the majority of students on campus.

The campus  -  as  Monash  University,  Berwick - celebrated its 10th anniversary on 29 April 2006.

On 7 March 2016 Monash announced that it would be closing the Berwick campus by 2018. On 15 July 2016 it was announced that Federation University Australia would take responsibility for the Berwick Campus from 2017 pending government approvals. This officially commenced on 1 January 2018, as a campus of Federation University Australia.

Facilities
Bowling
Mini Golf
Ice Cream Trucks
Disco
Sky Diving
Book Shop
Cafeteria (Dhanga)
Library
Student Accommodation
Halls of Residence
North Flats
Residential Pavilion
Student lounge
Oscar's (Campus Bar)
Sporting and Fitness facilities
Tennis court
Basketball court
Cricket nets
Soccer pitch
The campus is also home to various organisations as well as an onsite medical centre (Berwick Healthcare), as well as the Nossal High School, which occupy various other parts of the site.

Transport
The campus is situated next to the Clyde Road exit ramp on the Princes Freeway. It takes approximately 45 minutes to travel to the campus from the Melbourne CBD. Permit parking is offered to students and staff as well as coin-operated daily ticket parking for infrequent drivers.

The Berwick train station is a seven-minute walk to the campus. Situated on the Pakenham line, trains run approximately every 20 minutes to and from the Melbourne CBD.

Notes and references

External links
Campus website

Federation University Australia
Campuses in Victoria (Australia)